Ljubica Drljača (Serbian Cyrillic: Љубица Дрљача; born August 4, 1978, in Novi Sad, SFR Yugoslavia) is a Serbian basketball coach and former basketball player. She plays small forward position and Power forward.

External links
Profile at fibaeurope.com
Profile at eurobasket.com

1978 births
Living people
Sportspeople from Novi Sad
Small forwards
Power forwards (basketball)
Serbian women's basketball players
ŽKK Vojvodina players
Serbian women's basketball coaches
Serbian expatriate basketball people in France
Serbian expatriate basketball people in Spain